The white-fronted wattle-eye (Platysteira albifrons) is a species of bird in the family Platysteiridae.
It is endemic to Angola.

Its natural habitats are subtropical or tropical dry forests, subtropical or tropical mangrove forests, and subtropical or tropical dry shrubland.
It is threatened by habitat loss.

References

white-fronted wattle-eye
Endemic birds of Angola
white-fronted wattle-eye
Taxonomy articles created by Polbot